Tryssogobius is a genus of small gobies native to the western Pacific Ocean.  The species in this genus are known colloquially as "fairygobies".

Species
There are currently seven recognized species in this genus:
 Tryssogobius colini Larson & Hoese, 2001 (Colin's fairygoby)
 Tryssogobius flavolineatus J. E. Randall, 2006 (Yellow-lined fairygoby)
 Tryssogobius longipes Larson & Hoese, 2001 (Longfin fairygoby)
 Tryssogobius nigrolineatus J. E. Randall, 2006 (Deepreef fairygoby)
 Tryssogobius porosus Larson & I. S. Chen, 2007
 Tryssogobius quinquespinus J. E. Randall, 2006 (Fivespine fairygoby)
 Tryssogobius sarah G. R. Allen & Erdmann, 2012 (Sarah's fairygoby)

References

Gobiidae
Taxa named by Helen K. Larson
Taxa named by Douglass F. Hoese